The 2003 Coastal Carolina Chanticleers football team represented Coastal Carolina University in the 2003 NCAA Division I-AA football season. The Chanticleers were led by first-year head coach David Bennett and played their home games at Brooks Stadium. In their inaugural season, Coastal Carolina competed as a member of the Big South Conference. They finished the season 6–5 with a 1–3 record in conference play.

Schedule

References

Coastal Carolina
Coastal Carolina Chanticleers football seasons
Coastal Carolina Chanticleers football